Akesina is a genus of moths in the family Anomoeotidae containing only one species Akesina basalis, which is known from Himachal Pradesh, India. Both the genus and species were first described by Frederic Moore in 1888.

References 

Anomoeotidae
Zygaenoidea genera
Monotypic moth genera
Moths of Asia